Dao Khanong is a khwaeng (sub-district) of Thon Buri district, Bangkok's Thonburi side. It is also the name of the surrounding area.

History and etymology
Dao Khanong roughly translates as 'swaggering star'. It is named after the Khlong (canal) Dao Khanong, which runs through the area and is regarded as the right tributary of Chao Phraya River, which connects the Chao Phraya River with Khlong Bang Khun Thian in the Bang Khun Thian, Chom Thong and Rat Burana areas. Khlong Dao Khanong is regarded as one of the most bustling water transport routes in Bangkok, because it is a tourist route.

There are several theories about the area's name.  All believe that it originates from the Mon people and Mon language, because of the numerous Mon population in the area. There are many buildings and neighbourhoods that have Mon roots, such as Wat Nang Nong, or tambon Song Khanong in  Phra Pradaeng District, Samut Prakan Province (across the Chao Phraya River).

In addition, there is a legend about two crocodiles fighting in this area, hence the name Dang Khanong ['crocodiles's swagger'], later distorted to Dao Khanong.

Dao Khanong was mentioned in "Nirat Mueang Klaeng" (นิราศเมืองแกลง), the travelogue poetry by the poet Sunthorn Phu in the early- Rattanakosin period.

Around 1970s–1990s, Dao Khanong was an area that was well known as the center for watch and glasses shops of Bangkok.

Geography
Neighbouring sub-districts are (from the north clockwise): Talat Phlu, Bukkhalo, and Samre in its district, Bang Kho Laem of Bang Kho Laem District (across the Chao Phraya River),  Chom Thong, and Bang Kho of Chom Thong District.

from http://www.king99.tech

Places

Talat Phlu BTS Station
Big C Supercenter Dao Khanong
Yan Nawa office of the Metropolitan Electricity Authority (MEA), Dao Khanong Sub-Branch
Dao Khanong Market
Dao Khanong Pier
Chao Mae Thapthim (Shui Wei Sheng Niang) Shrine
Lao Pun Tao Kong Shrine
Buan Chun Tua Almshouse
Wat Klang Dao Khanong
Dao Khanong High School

Transport
Khlong Dao Khanong
Ratchadapisek Road
Somdet Phra Chao Tak Sin Road
Suk Sawat Road
Charoen Nakhon Road
Mahaisawan Road and Mahaisawan Intersection
Bukkhalo Intersection
Krungthep Bridge (Bangkok Bridge)
Rama III Bridge (New Bangkok Bridge)

References

Subdistricts of Bangkok
Neighbourhoods of Bangkok
Thon Buri district
Populated places on the Chao Phraya River